Syed Sultan was a medieval Bengali Muslim writer and epic poet. He is best known for his magnum opus, the Nabibangsha, which was one of the first translations of the Qisas Al-Anbiya into the Bengali language. His literary works have been included in the curriculum of school level, secondary, and higher secondary Bengali literature in Bangladesh. His origin is debated though most attribute his origin to Patiya in Chittagong. There are claims that he is the same person as a certain Syed Sultan from Taraf in Greater Sylhet, although this is highly unlikely due to the time periods.

Bibliography
Nabibangsha (The Prophets of Islam, a big epic about more than 20 prophets from Adam to Musa and Isa.)
Rasulcharita
Shab-e-Meraj (The Night of Ascension)
Ofate Rasul (Death of the Messenger)
Jaikum Rajar Lorai (King Jaikum's Battle)
Iblis Nama (Book of Iblis)
Gyan Pradeep (Lamp of Knowledge)
Gyan Chautisha(Chautisha of Knowledge; abridged version of the above)
Marfati Gan
Padabali

References

 Bangla Sahitya (Bengali Literature), the national textbook of intermediate (college) level of Bangladesh published in 1996 by all educational boards.

1550 births
1648 deaths
Bengali Muslims
16th-century Bengalis
17th-century Bengalis
People from Chittagong District
Bengali male poets
Bengali writers
Bengali-language writers
16th-century Bengali poets
17th-century Bengali poets